Parth Bhut (born 4 August 1997) is an Indian cricketer. He made his first-class debut on 25 December 2019, for Saurashtra in the 2019–20 Ranji Trophy. He made his List A debut on 1 March 2021, for Saurashtra in the 2020–21 Vijay Hazare Trophy. He made his Twenty20 debut on 4 November 2021, for Saurashtra in the 2021–22 Syed Mushtaq Ali Trophy.

References

External links
 

1997 births
Living people
Indian cricketers
Saurashtra cricketers
Place of birth missing (living people)